Sir Graham Martyn Dorey (15 December 1932  – 25 June 2015) was the Bailiff of Guernsey from February 1992 to March 1999.

Biography

The second son of a local grower, Martyn Dorey, he was evacuated to Scotland during World War II.  He was educated at Kingswood School Bath, University of Bristol, and then Ecole des Roches Verneuil in Caen in 1959, he was made an Advocate of the Royal Court of Guernsey 1960.

Whilst in office as Bailiff of Guernsey he oversaw the response to territorial fishing disputes with French fishermen within the Gulf of St Malo. He did not open public buildings in his name, however while Deputy Bailiff he campaigned for a Guernsey Flag, and chaired the Guernsey Flag Committee.

Both he and his wife Penelope supported local causes.  Lady Penelope died of cancer during her husband's term of office in September 1996; she received a public funeral. The couple had four children: Suzanne, Jane, Robert and Martyn. In August 1998, Sir Graham married Cicely Ruth Lummis, a widow.

External links
 World Statesmen
 Guernsey Flag

References

1932 births
Knights Bachelor
Bailiffs of Guernsey
2015 deaths